Integrin beta-3 (β3) or CD61 is a protein that in humans is encoded by the ITGB3 gene.  CD61 is a cluster of differentiation found on thrombocytes.

Structure and function
The ITGB3 protein product is the integrin beta chain beta 3. Integrins are integral cell-surface proteins composed of an alpha chain and a beta chain. A given chain may combine with multiple partners resulting in different integrins. Integrin beta 3 is found along with the alpha IIb chain in platelets. Integrins are known to participate in cell adhesion as well as cell-surface-mediated signaling.

Role in endometriosis
Defectively expressed β3 integrin subunit has been correlated with presence of endometriosis, and has been suggested as a putative marker of this condition.

Interactions
CD61 has been shown to interact with PTK2, ITGB3BP, TLN1 and CIB1.

See also
 Glycoprotein IIb/IIIa

References

Further reading

External links
 
 ITGB3 Info with links in the Cell Migration Gateway 
 

Integrins